Seedpeople is a 1992 film, executive produced by Charles Band (who originated the basic plot) and directed by Peter Manoogian. It stars Sam Hennings, Dane Witherspoon, Anne Betancourt and Andrea Roth.

Plot
Seed pods from space land in the area surrounding a small rural town, and the seeds become alien creatures that contaminate the human population in the area, turning people into unwilling seed pods that in turn hatch into even more monsters.

Cast
 Sam Hennings	...	Tom Baines
 Andrea Roth	...	Heidi Tucker
 Dane Witherspoon	...	Brad Yates
 Bernard Kates	...	Doc Roller
 Holly Fields	...	Kim Tucker
 John Mooney	...	Frank Tucker
 Anne Betancourt	...	Mrs. Santiago

Reception

References

External links

 
  
  
 Film trailer for Seedpeople at Full Moon Features

1990s comedy horror films
1992 horror films
American comedy horror films
American supernatural horror films
1992 films
Films directed by Peter Manoogian
Puppet films
1992 comedy films
1990s English-language films
1990s American films